The 2011 Central American Junior and Youth Championships in Athletics were held at the Estadio Nacional Flor Blanca "Magico Gonzalez" in San Salvador, El Salvador, between June 18–19, 2011. Organized by the Central American Isthmus Athletic Confederation (CADICA), it was the 24th edition of the Junior (U-20) and the 19th edition of the Youth (U-18) competition. A total of 80 events were contested, 42 by boys and 38 by girls.

Medal summary
Complete results can be found on the CADICA webpage.

Junior

Boys (U-20)

Girls (U-20)

Youth

Boys (U-18)

Girls (U-18)

Medal table (unofficial)

Team trophies
The placing table for team trophy awarded to the 1st place overall team (boys and girls categories) was published.

Overall

Participation
A total number of 245 athletes and 51 officials were reported to participate in the event.

 (38)
 (44)
 (55)
 (49)
 (18)
 (16)
 Panamá (25)

References

 
Central American Junior
Central American Junior
International athletics competitions hosted by El Salvador
Athl
2011 in youth sport
21st century in San Salvador